The government of the French colony of French Guiana was headed by a governor until 1946, when the territory became an overseas department of France.

Governors of Guiana during the Portuguese occupation (1809-1817) 
January - October 1809           Colonel of Artillery Manuel Marques
October 1809 - February 1812     Pedro Alexandrino Pinto de Sousa
February 1812 - November 1817    João Severiano Maciel da Costa

Governors of French Guiana (1817-1946)
1817 - 1819 Claude Carra de Saint-Cyr  
1819 - 1823 Pierre Clément de Laussat
1823 - 1825 Pierre Bernard Milius
1825 - 1826 Charles de Muyssart
1826 - 1827 Joseph de Burgues de Missiessy 
1827 - 1829 Louis Henri de Saulces de Freycinet
1829 - 1836 Jean Jubelin
1836 - 1837 François-Dominique Laurens de Choisy
1837 - 1839 Paul de Nourquer du Camper 
1839 - 1841 Jean-Baptiste-Marie-Augustin Gourbeyre
1841 - 1843 Pons-Guillaume-Bazile Charmasson de Puylaval  
1843 - 1845 Marie Jean-François Layrle
1845 - 1846 Jean-Baptiste Bertrand Armand Cadéot
1846 - 1850 André-Aimé Pariset
1850 - 1851 Eugène Maissin        
1851        Jean-François Vidal de Lingendes
1851 - 1852 Octave Pierre Antoine Henri de Chabannes-Curton
1852 - 1853 Joseph Napoléon Sébastien Sarda Garriga
1853 - 1854 Martin Fourichon
1854 - 1855 Louis Adolphe Bonard
1855 - 1856 Antoine Alphonse Masset
1856 - 1859 Auguste Baudin
1859 - 1864 Louis-Marie-François Tardy de Montravel
1864 - 1865 Antoine Favre
1865 - 1870 Agathon Hennique
1870        J. A. A. Noyer
1870 - 1877 Jean-Louis Loubère
1877        A. E. Bouet 
1877 - 1880 Marie Alfred Armand Huart (1826 - ?)
1880        P. A. Trève
1880 - 1883 Charles Alexandre Lacouture (1829 - 1917)
1883 - 1884 Henri Isidore Chessé (1839 - 1912)
1884 - 1885 Jean Baptiste Antoine Lougnon (1843 - ?)
1885 - 1887 Léonce Pierre Henri Le Cardinal (1830 - 1891)
1888 - 1891 Anne Léodor Philotée Metellus Gerville-Réache (1849 - 1911)
1891 - 1893 Louis Albert Grodet (1853 - 1933)
1893        Paul Émile Joseph Casimir Fawtier (1837 - 1903)
1893 - 1895 Camille Charvein (1834 - ?)
1895 - 1896 Henri Félix de Lamothe (1843 - 1926)
1896 - 1898 Henri Éloi Danel
1898        Henri Roberdeau
1899 - 1901 Louis Mouttet                                 
1901 - 1903 Émile Merwart
1904 - 1905 Louis Albert Grodet
1905        Charles Emmanuel Joseph Marchal
1905 - 1906 Victor François Ferdinand Rey
1906        Louis Alphonse Bonhoure (1864 - 1909)
1906 - 1907 Édouard Picanon (1854 - 1939)
1907 - 1909 François Pierre Rodier (1854 - ?)
1909 - 1910 William Maurice Fawtier (1867 - ?)
1910        Fernand Ernest Thérond
1910 - 1911 Paul Samary (1848 - 1911)
1911        Denys Joseph Goujon (1863 - ?)
1911 - 1913 Fernand Lévecque
1913 - 1914 Pierre Didelot
1914 - 1916 Fernand Lévecque
1916        Pierre Didelot 
1916 - 1917 Georges Lévy (1867 - ?)
1917        Jules Gérard Auguste Lauret (1866 - ?)
1917 - 1918 Antoine Joseph Xavier Barre (1864 - 1924)
1918 - 1923 Henri Alphonse Joseph Lejeune
1923        Julien Edgard Cantau
1923 - 1926 Marc Émile Charles Jean Chanel (1882 - 1943)
1926 - 1927 Gabriel Henri Joseph Thaly
1927        François Adrien Juvanon (1875 - ?)
1927 - 1928 Émile Buhot-Launay (1881-1970)
1928 - 1929 Camille Théodore Raoul Maillet
1929 - 1931 Bernard Siadoux
1931 - 1933 Louis Joseph Bouge (1878 - 1960)
1933 - 1935 Julien Georges Lamy
1935 - 1936 Charles Max de Masson de Saint-Félix
1936        Pierre Tap
1936 - 1938 René Veber 
1938 - 1942 Robert Paul Chot-Plassot
1942 - 1943 René Veber
1943 - 1944 Jean Alexandre Léon Rapenne (1901 - 1952)
1944 - 1946 Jules Eucher Surlemont (1897 – 1983)

References